Alija Gušanac ("Alija from Gusinje";  1804–05), known in epic poetry as Gušanac-Alija, was an Albanian Ottoman brigand (krdžalija) that served the Dahije, the renegade Janissaries that had taken the rule of the Sanjak of Smederevo following a coup. He was from Gusinje, hence his byname. At the start of the Serbian uprising against the Dahije (1804), Gušanac was in Jagodina. He was subsequently appointed commander of Belgrade by the Dahije.

References

Sources
  
 

People of the First Serbian Uprising
Rebels from the Ottoman Empire
People from Gusinje
Albanians from the Ottoman Empire